The Șerbeni is a left tributary of the river Bunea in Romania. It flows into the Bunea near Răchita.

References

Rivers of Romania
Rivers of Timiș County